Willis may refer to:

Places

United States
 Willis, Florida, an unincorporated community
 Willis, Indiana, an unincorporated community
 Willis, Kansas, a city
 Willis, Michigan, an unincorporated community
 Willis, Nebraska, an unincorporated community
 Willis, Oklahoma, an unincorporated community
 Willis, Texas, a city
 Willis, Floyd County, Virginia, an unincorporated community
 Willis, Russell County, Virginia, an unincorporated community
 Willis River, a tributary of the James River in Virginia

Elsewhere
 Willis, Grenada, a town
 Willis Island, Coral Sea Islands Territory, Australia
 Willis Islands, South Georgia Islands

Arts and entertainment

Works
 Giselle or The Willis, a ballet (in the ballet, the Willis are a group of supernatural women)
 Le Villi (The Willis or The Fairies), an opera-ballet composed by Giacomo Puccini 
 Willis (album), by The Pietasters

Fictional characters
 Willis Jackson (character), in the 1970s-1980s American sitcom Diff'rent Strokes
 Willis (Digimon), in the anime series
 Tom and Helen Willis, a fictional couple on the sitcom The Jeffersons
 Willis family, in the Australian soap opera Neighbours
 Willis the Bouncer, a Martian in the novel Red Planet by Robert A. Heinlein
 Private Willis, the soldier (of the Grenadier Guards) in the Gilbert and Sullivan operetta Iolanthe
 Leslie Willis, DC Comics villain Livewire (DC Comics)

Buildings
 Willis Tower, Chicago, the tallest building in the United States and ninth-tallest in the world
 Willis Building (London), a skyscraper
 Willis Building, Ipswich, a lowrise office building

Companies
 Willis & Co., a former Canadian piano company
 Willis Group Holdings, a former insurance broker

People
 Willis (given name), a list of people
 Willis (surname), a list of people

Other uses
 Willis Street, Wellington, New Zealand
 Willis High School, Conroe, Texas, United States
 Ulmus 'Willis', a hybrid elm cultivar

See also
 Wilis (disambiguation)
 Wyllis
 Wills (disambiguation)
 Willes (surname)